Polet can refer to:

Grégoire Polet (born 1978), French-speaking Belgian writer
Polet Airlines, a Russian airline
Polet, a commonly shortened name of Vinmonopolet, a Norwegian state-owned monopoly retailer of alcohol beverages
Polet, a Thursday supplement of Slovenian newspaper, Delo